Nils Antonio (born 31 March 1963) is a Jamaican long-distance runner. He competed in the men's marathon at the 1996 Summer Olympics.

References

External links
 

1963 births
Living people
Athletes (track and field) at the 1996 Summer Olympics
Jamaican male long-distance runners
Jamaican male marathon runners
Olympic athletes of Jamaica
Place of birth missing (living people)
Olympic male marathon runners